Willsborough or similar terms may refer to:

 Willsborough, a townland in County Tipperary, Ireland 
 Willesborough, suburb of Ashford, Kent, England 
 Willborough, Burlingame Terrace, Burlingame, California, United States, a neighborhood 
 Willsboro, New York, a town in upstate New York
 Willsboro (CDP), New York, a hamlet within the town